John Robert Ducker (born 12 June 1934) is a former cricketer who played first-class cricket for South Australia from 1952 to 1963.

John Ducker was a wicket-keeper who played most of his matches for South Australia when the state team’s principal keepers, Gil Langley and Barry Jarman, were away on national duty. He was a useful batsman whose best season was 1959-60, when he scored 489 runs at an average of 37.61, with five fifties and a highest score of 76 against New South Wales.

See also
 List of South Australian representative cricketers

References

External links

1934 births
Living people
South Australia cricketers
Australian cricketers
Cricketers from Adelaide